The .360 No 5 Rook is an obsolete centerfire rifle cartridge.

Overview
The .360 No 5 Rook is a straight rimmed cartridge originally designed for hunting small game and target shooting in rook rifles, although it was also used as a pistol cartridge.
 
The .360 No 5 Rook was introduced between 1875 and 1880 by lengthening the older .380 Long cartridge.   This cartridge was initially available in both  rifle loadings and  pistol loadings, both cartridges being interchangeable.  Shot and blank cartridges were also available.
 
As with other rook rifle cartridges, the .360 No 5 Rook was superseded as a small game hunting and target cartridge by the .22 Long Rifle.

See also
 Rook rifle
 List of rifle cartridges
 9 mm rifle cartridges

References

Footnotes

Bibliography
 Barnes, Frank C., Cartridges of the World, 15th ed, Gun Digest Books, Iola, 2016, .
 Cartridgecollector, ".300 Rook target", cartridgecollector.net, retrieved 22 April 2017.
 Imperial War Museums, "9.1 x 27R : Kynoch ; .360 No 5 Rook & .360 No 5 Revolver", iwm.org.uk, retrieved 26 April 2017.

External links
 Ammo-One, ".360 No. 5 Rook", ammo-one.com, retrieved 22 April 2017.
 Cartridgecollector, " 360 No.5 (Rifle) 1.05" ", cartridgecollector.net, retrieved 26 April 2017.
 Municion, ".360 No 5 Revolver & Rifle", municion.org , retrieved 26 April 2017.

Pistol and rifle cartridges
British firearm cartridges
Rook rifle cartridges